Drusilla Wills (14 November 18846 August 1951) was a British stage and film actress. After making her stage debut in 1902, she played character roles in many films, including as a jury member in Alfred Hitchcock's Murder! (1930).

Selected filmography
 What the Butler Saw (1924)
 To What Red Hell (1929)
 Murder! (1930)
 The Lodger (1932)
 Little Miss Nobody (1933)
 Britannia of Billingsgate (1933)
 The Medicine Man (1933)
 The Black Abbot (1934)
 The Night Club Queen (1934)
 The Big Splash (1935)
 Squibs (1935)
 Non-Stop New York (1937)
 The High Command (1938)
 A Spot of Bother (1938)
 Yellow Sands (1938)
 The Man in Grey (1943)
 Welcome, Mr. Washington (1944)
 Champagne Charlie (1944)
 Johnny Frenchman (1945)
 The Queen of Spades (1949)

References

External links 

1884 births
1951 deaths
English film actresses
English silent film actresses
20th-century English actresses
English stage actresses